Chouioia is a genus of endoparasitic wasp of the family Eulophidae. Chouioia cunea is considered an important parasite of the fall webworm in China, where the moth is an invasive species.

References

 Key to Nearctic eulophid genera
 Universal Chalcidoidea Database
Yang, Z.Q. 1989, A new genus and species of Eulophidae (Hymenoptera: Chalcidoidea) parasitizing Hyphantria cunea (Drury) (Lepidoptera: Arctiidae) in China. Entomotaxonomia 11(1-2):117-130.

Eulophidae